was a general in the Imperial Japanese Army during World War II.

Biography

Early career
Ayabe graduated from the 27th class of the Army Cavalry School in October 1917. On receiving his commission as Second lieutenant, he was posted to the 12th Cavalry Regiment. He served in the Siberian Intervention from August 1918 to July 1919. Ayabe then attended the Army War College (Japan) in 1924, and was promoted to captain after graduation. He served in a number of staff positions, and was sent to Poland and the Soviet Union from August 1928-November 1930 as a military attaché. After his return to Japan, he was promoted to major, and in 1934 to lieutenant colonel.

Wartime career
From 1935-1937, Ayabe served as Chief of the Maneuvers Section of the Kwantung Army, and from 1937–1939, as Chief of 1st Section (Organization & Mobilization) in the Imperial Japanese Army General Staff, still based in Manchukuo at the start of the Second Sino-Japanese War.

From 1939-1940, Ayabe was commander of the 25th Cavalry Regiment, based in China, and was subsequently promoted to the position of Deputy Chief of Staff of the IJA 3rd Army (Manchuria) in 1940. From 1940-1941, he was sent on a military liaison mission to Berlin and Rome to coordinate efforts between Japan and the other Axis members of the Tripartite Alliance.

Subsequently, from July 1941 – 1942, Ayabe was deputy Chief of Staff of the Kwantung Army, Manchuria, and became Chief of Staff of the Japanese First Area Army (Manchuria) from July 1942.

After his promotion to lieutenant general in October 1943, Ayabe was reassigned to the Southern Expeditionary Army Group as Deputy Chief of Staff and was based in Singapore. The Southern Army became the Japanese Seventh Area Army in 1944, and Ayabe was appointed as Chief of Staff. However, he was badly injured in an airplane crash in February 1944, and was assigned to staff duty in Tokyo through the remainder of the war.

Ayabe retired from active military service with the dissolution of the Imperial Japanese Army at the end of World War II. From 1955 to 1970, he worked as an advisor for Mitsubishi Heavy Industries.

References

Books

Notes

External links

1894 births
1980 deaths
Japanese generals
Imperial Japanese Army personnel of World War II
Military personnel from Ōita Prefecture
Japanese military attachés
Mitsubishi Heavy Industries people